Raginpert (also Raghinpert or Reginbert) was the Duke of Turin and then King of the Lombards briefly in 701.  He was the son of Godepert and grandson of Aripert I.  He usurped the throne in 701 and removed Liutpert, his grandnephew, putting his son Aripert in line for the succession.  He and his Neustrians (men of Piedmont) went out to meet the regent, Ansprand, in battle and defeated him at Novara, but died shortly after.  His son Aripert did not succeed in taking the throne right away.

|-

Notes 

7th-century births
701 deaths
8th-century Lombard monarchs
Lombard warriors
Bavarian dynasty
Year of birth unknown
Baiuvarii